Enteromius candens is a species of ray-finned fish in the genus Enteromius from the upper and middle Congo Basin, where it is known to be harvested for human consumption.

Footnotes 
 

Enteromius
Taxa named by John Treadwell Nichols
Taxa named by Ludlow Griscom
Fish described in 1917